The 2022 AFF Championship (officially AFF Mitsubishi Electric Cup 2022 due to sponsorship reasons) was the 14th edition of the AFF Championship, the football championship of nations affiliated to the ASEAN Football Federation (AFF) and was the 1st edition under the name AFF Mitsubishi Electric Cup.

The final tournament ran from 20 December 2022 to 16 January 2023.

Thailand were the defending champions, and won the tournament by a 3–2 aggregate score in the two-legged final against Vietnam to secure their seventh title. Alexandré Pölking, become the 4th coach to win multiple titles, the first being on the 2020 edition.

Format 
The AFF Mitsubishi Electric Cup 2022 followed the 2018 format, a change from the 2020 format with a centralised venue due to the COVID-19 pandemic in Southeast Asia.

In the current format, the nine highest-ranked teams automatically qualified with the 10th and 11th ranked teams playing in a two-legged qualifier. The 10 teams were split in two groups of five and play a round-robin system, with each team playing two home and two away fixtures. Away goals rule was applied, but not in extra-time.

A draw was made to determine where the teams play while the format of the knockout round remained unchanged.

Qualification 

Nine teams automatically qualified to the AFF Championship final tournament; they were separated into their respective pots based on their performance in the last two editions.

Brunei and Timor-Leste, the two lowest-ranked teams, played a two-legged tie to determine the 10th and final qualifier in November 2022, with Brunei hosting both legs due to Timor-Leste lacking a FIFA-standard venue. Brunei secured qualification, and their second appearance in the tournament after 26 years, by defeating Timor-Leste 6–3 on aggregrate.

Australia, a member since 2013, still decided not to debut at the tournament.

Draw 
The draw for the 2022 AFF Championship was held on 30 August 2022 in Bangkok, Thailand at 14:00 (GMT+07:00). The pot placements followed each teams' progress based on the two previous editions.

At the time of the draw, the identity of the team that secured qualification was unknown and was automatically placed into Pot 5. Brunei qualified for the final tournament by defeating Timor-Leste.

Squads 

Each team were allowed a preliminary squad of 50 players. A final squad of 23 players (three of whom must be goalkeepers) needed to be registered.

Officials 
The following officials were chosen for the competition.

Referees

 Chen Hsin-chuan
 Tam Ping Wun
 Yusuke Araki
 Jumpei Iida
 Hiroki Kasahara
 Ryuji Sato
 Yudai Yamamoto
 Adham Makhadmeh
 Ahmed Faisal Al Ali
 Omar Al-Yaqoubi
 Mohammed Al Hoaish
 Majed Al Shamrani
 Choi Hyun-jai
 Kim Dae-yong
 Kim Hee-gon
 Kim Jong-hyeok
 Ko Hyung-jin
 Omar Mohamed Al Ali 
 Aziz Asimov

Assistant referees

 Mohammad Faisal Ali
 Chen Hsiao-en
 So Kai Man
 Nurhadi Sulchan
 Bambang Syamsudar
 Yusuke Hamamoto
 Jun Mihara
 Isao Nishihashi
 Takumi Takagi
 Yosuke Takebe
 Kota Watanabe
 Hamza Adel Abu Obaid
 Mohammad Al Kalaf
 Ahmad Al Roalleh
 Ahmad Mansour Samara Muhsen
 Bang Gi-yeol
 Jang Jong-pil
 Kang Dong-ho
 Kwak Seung-soon
 Park Kyun-yong
 Park Sang-jun
 Song Bong-keun
 Omar Ali Al Jamal
 Faisal Nasser Al Qahtani
 Abdulrahim Al Shammari
 Khalaf Zaid Al Shammari
 Fahad Awaiedh Al Umri
 Kilar Ladsavong
 Mohd Arif Shamil Abdul Rasid
 Hamed Talib Al Ghafri
 Faisal Eid Alshammari
 Juma Al Burshaid
 Yousuf Al Shamari
 Ronnie Koh Min Kiat
 Apichit Nophuan
 Tanate Chuchuen
 Supawan Hinthong 
 Pattarapong Kijsathit
 Jasem Abdulla Al Ali
 Timur Gaynullin
 Nguyễn Trung Hậu

Fourth officials

 Abdul Hakim Mohd Haidi 
 Chy Samdy
 Thoriq Alkatiri
 Xaypaseuth Phongsanit
 Souei Vongkham
 Yassin Tuan Mohd Hanafiah
 Muhammad Usaid Jamal 
 Muhammad Nazmi Nasaruddin
 Mohd Amirul Izwan Yaacob
 Kyaw Zwall Lwin
 Clifford Daypuyat
 Songkran Bunmeekiart
 Pansa Chaisanit 
 Mongkolchai Pechsri
 Sivakorn Pu-Udom
 Warintorn Sassadee 
 Torphong Somsing
 Ahmad A'Qashah
 Muhammad Taqi Al Jaafari
 Ngô Duy Lân

Venues 
There was one venue for each participating nation in the tournament, with each nation getting two group matches played in their home stadium. Brunei played their home matches at Malaysia's Kuala Lumpur Stadium due to their own stadium did not met the standards.

Gelora Bung Karno Stadium were attended by spectators with a capacity of 70 percent of the total number of seats, which was around 50,000 seats. The decision for a maximum attendance capacity of 70 percent were based on the risk assessment and trials for further implementation.

Group stage 

Tiebreakers
Ranking in each group shall be determined as follows:
 Greater number of points obtained in all the group matches;
 Goal difference in all the group matches;
 Greater number of goals scored in all the group matches.
If two or more teams are equal on the basis on the above three criteria, the place shall be determined as follows:
 Result of the direct match between the teams concerned;
 Penalty shoot-out if only the teams are tied, and they met in the last round of the group;
 Drawing lots by the Organising Committee.

Group A

Group B

Knockout stage

Bracket

Semi-finals 

First leg

Second leg

Vietnam won 2–0 on aggregate.

Thailand won 3–1 on aggregate.

Final 

First leg

Second leg

Thailand won 3–2 on aggregate.

Statistics

Winner

Awards

Goalscorers

Discipline 
In the tournament, a player will be suspended for the subsequent match in the competition for either getting red card or accumulating two yellow cards in two different matches.

On 3 January 2023, AFF confirmed that Azam Azmi would be suspended for two matches, and would be absent against Singapore and the semi-finals first leg against Thailand.

Tournament teams ranking 
This table will show the ranking of teams throughout the tournament.

Marketing

Matchballs 
The official ball for the 2022 edition is called BERSATU, which is sponsored by Warrix Sports. This is the second edition that Warrix has been designated as the Official Match Ball and Sports Apparel Supplier of the Championship.

Sponsorship 
 Source:

Media coverage

Incidents and controversies 
The Group B match between Malaysia and Vietnam was marred by controversy, when Japanese referee Ryuji Sato who officiated the match gave a sudden controversial decision to award a penalty to Vietnam following a clash between Malaysian Azam Azmi and Vietnamese Đoàn Văn Hậu outside the penalty box which saw Azam being sent off, although a similar foul made by Văn Hậu towards Azam was ignored by the same referee. A complaint was made by the Football Association of Malaysia (FAM) towards the ASEAN Football Federation (AFF) regarding the "perceived biasedness of Sato's officiating conduct" since a similar incident had also occurred before in another Malaysia-Vietnam encounter during 2022 FIFA World Cup qualification held in the United Arab Emirates. Through the letter, FAM requested for Sato to never be refereeing any matches involving Malaysia in the future. Nevertheless, earlier before the controversial decision was made, Sato announced that 2022 would be the last year of his refereeing career when he announced his retirement by the end of the year. On 3 January 2023, AFF responded to FAM's letter by giving Azam a two-match ban, where he would miss Malaysia's last group stage match against Singapore and the semi-final first leg against Thailand. Azam also needed to pay a fine of US$1,000 that had to be settled in 30 days. The decisions were not appealable.

Before the Group A match between Indonesia and Thailand, a bus that transported the Thai team was disturbed and halted by Indonesian hooligans, which resulted in the bus needing to be escorted and the Gelora Bung Karno Stadium heavily guarded by the Indonesian National Armed Forces (TNI), Public Order Agency (Satpol PP), firefighters and medical workers. During the match, home fans snatched a Thai flag, stepped and sat on it. Following the incidents, the Football Association of Thailand (FAT) sent an official complaint to AFF with the Football Association of Indonesia (PSSI) expressing their apology and urging leaders and liaisons for supporters to further ensure that further incidents were prevented. FIFA later asked Indonesia to tighten their security for their upcoming match against Vietnam.

The attendance seats for the upcoming 1st leg semi-final match between Malaysia and Thailand in Bukit Jalil national stadium was only available for 59,000 seats, where 21,000 seats had to be vacant due to a world tour concert by Jay Chou on which the singer also held a concert at Singapore's National Stadium earlier, which forced Singapore to use Jalan Besar Stadium instead. Originally due to be held on 3 January 2023, which fell on the same matchday between Malaysia and Singapore, however it got postponed to 15 January 2023. The Malaysian government and FAM hardly tried to make negotiations and appeals, however a decision was not applied. This stirred some Malaysian football fans to throw hate to the singer's social media account instead. On 7 January 2023, Chou finally stated that he could delay the concert, with a permission from FAM. To relief the disappointments among many of the football fans who were unable to attend due to limited spots in the stadium caused by the issues, the Malaysian government in collaboration with local authorities erected 14 big screens in chosen locations nationwide.

Earlier before the 1st leg match between Malaysia and Thailand in Kuala Lumpur, the Royal Malaysia Police (PDRM) announced that a security measure which included body checks as well as bags and items checks would be carried out at each entrance and after entering the stadium grounds. The police released a list of prohibited items that were not allowed to be brought into the stadium such as firecrackers, fireworks, flares, helmets, laser pens, sharp objects and alcoholic beverages. This included umbrellas or walking sticks, powerbanks, water bottles, lighters and cigarettes (including electronic cigarettes). Despite this preventive measures, as seen during the match, some Malaysian fans were still able to smuggle prohibited items into the stadium when some of them were seen pointing green laser lights towards Thai defender Pansa Hemviboon as well as towards the left side face of referee of the match Kim Dae-yong, especially after the second goal of Malaysia from their centre-back player Dominic Tan was disallowed by the referee due to collision with the Thai player.

Notes

References

External links 
  of the AFF Mitsubishi Electric Cup
  of the ASEAN Football Federation

 
AFF Championship tournaments
1
1
2022 in Brunei football
2022 in Burmese football
2022 in Cambodian football
AFF Championship
2022 in Laotian football
2022 in Malaysian football
2022 in Philippine football
2022 in Thai football
2022 in Singaporean football
2022 in Vietnamese football
AFF
AFF
2023 in Thai football
AFF Championship
AFF Championship